This is a list of libraries in the Republic of Austria. A more extensive list is available on the German Wikipedia.

National libraries 
 Austrian National Library (Österreichische Nationalbibliothek), Vienna
 Austrian Academy of Sciences Library (Bibliothek der Österreichischen Akademie der Wissenschaften), Vienna

Government libraries 
 Administrative Library of the Austrian Federal Chancellery (Administrative Bibliothek des Bundes), Vienna
 Federal Educational Library for Lower Austria (Bundesstaatliche Pädagogische Bibliothek für Niederösterreich), St. Pölten
 Library of the Federal Institute for Agriculture, (Bibliothek der Bundesanstalt für Agrarwirtschaft), Vienna

State and regional libraries 
 Burgenländische Landesbibliothek, Burgenland
 Kärntner Landesbibliothek, Carinthia 
 Niederösterreichische Landesbibliothek, Lower Austria
 Oberösterreichische Landesbibliothek, Upper Austria
 Universitäts- und Landesbibliothek Salzburg, Salzburg
 Steiermärkische Landesbibliothek, Steiermark
 Universitäts- und Landesbibliothek Tirol, Tirol
 Vorarlberger Landesbibliothek, Vorarlberg
 Wienbibliothek im Rathaus, the library of the city and state of Vienna

City libraries 
 Büchereien Wien, the municipal library system of Vienna
 Stadtbücherei Bregenz
 Stadtbücherei Dornbirn
 Stadtbücherei Eisenstadt
 Stadtbibliothek Feldkirch
 Stadtbibliothek Graz
 Stadtbücherei Innsbruck
 Stadtbücherei Leonding
 Stadtbibliothek Linz
 Stadtbibliothek Salzburg
 Stadtbücherei St. Pölten
 Stadtbücherei Steyr
 Stadtbücherei Wels
 Stadtbücherei Wiener Neustadt

Specialized libraries 
 Admont Abbey Library
 Altenburg Abbey Library
 ANNO (Austrian Newspapers Online), an online library
 Bibliothek von unten, a left-wing, alternative library in Vienna
 Esperanto library, Vienna
 Austrian Chamber of Labor Library for Social Sciences, Vienna
 Fotohof, a contemporary photography library in Salzburg
 Klosterneuburg Abbey Library
 Kremsmünster Abbey Library
 Melk Abbey Library 
 Michaelbeuern Abbey Library
 Saint Paul's Abbey, Lavanttal

Higher education libraries

Fachhochschule 
 Bibliothek der Fachhochschule St. Pölten
 Bibliothek der Fachhochschule Vorarlberg
 Fachhochschulbibliothek Kärnten

Hochschule 
 Bibliothek der Hochschule für Agrar- und Umweltpädagogik Vienna
 Bibliothek der Philosophisch-Theologischen Hochschule St. Pölten

Universities 
 University Library of Vienna (Universitätsbibliothek Wein), the largest research library in Austria
 University Library of Graz (Universitätsbibliothek Graz), Graz
 Universitätsbibliothek University of Innsbruck
 Universitätsbibliothek University of Klagenfurt
 Library, University for Continuing Education Krems, Krems an der Donau
 Universitätsbibliothek University of Leoben
 Universitätsbibliothek University of Linz
 Universitätsbibliothek Mozarteum Salzburg
 Universitätsbibliothek University of Salzburg
 Universitätsbibliothek der Akademie der bildenden Künste Wien 
 Universitätsbibliothek der Medizinischen Universität Wien
 Universitätsbibliothek der Technischen Universität Wien 
 Universitätsbibliothek der Universität für Angewandte Kunst Wien 
 Universitätsbibliothek der Universität für Bodenkultur Wien
 Universitätsbibliothek der Universität für Musik und darstellende Kunst Wien 
 Universitätsbibliothek der Veterinärmedizinischen Universität Wien 
 Universitätsbibliothek der Wirtschaftsuniversität Wien

Library organizations 
 Österreichischer Bibliothekenverbund, catalogue and service collaboration for Austrian libraries

See also 
 List of libraries in Germany
 Liechtensteinische Landesbibliothek
 List of schools in Austria
 List of universities in Austria
 Open access in Austria

References

Bibliography
 

Austria
 
Libraries
Libraries